The 1947 West Virginia State Yellow Jackets football team was an American football team that represented West Virginia State University as a member of the Colored Intercollegiate Athletic Association (CIAA) during the 1947 college football season. In their third season under head coach Mark Cardwell, the team compiled a 7–2–1 record, shut out five of ten opponents, and ranked No. 14 among the nation's black college football teams according to the Pittsburgh Courier and its Dickinson Rating System. The team played its home games at Lakin Field in Institute, West Virginia.

Schedule

References

West Virginia State
West Virginia State Yellow Jackets football seasons
West Virginia State Yellow Jackets football